Marius Søfteland Neset (born 2 January 1985 in Os, Hordaland) is a Norwegian jazz musician (saxophone) living in Copenhagen. He is known from collaborations within the jazz bands "People Are Machines", "Kaktusch", "JazzKamikaze" and Django Bates projects "StoRMChaser" big band and "Human Chain". He is the son of music teachers guitarist Terje Neset (b. 1959) and pianist Anne Leni Søfteland Sæbø (b. 1961), and the brother of the vocalist Anna Søfteland Neset (b. 1987) flautist Ingrid Søfteland Neset (b. 1992).

Career 
Neset holds a Master's degree at the Copenhagen Rhythmic Music Conservatory 2008, and finished Soloist studies under the guidance of Django Bates among others, at the same place in 2010. The same year he toured with the Klüvers Big Band performing their Rolling Stones project, with whom he did a gig at the Kongsberg Jazzfestival.

The debut album under his own name was Suite for the Seven Mountains (2008). Neset called the band "People Are Machines", including Magnus Hjorth (piano), Petter Eldh (double bass) and Anton Eger (drums), accompanied by a string quartet. On his 2nd solo album Golden Xplosion (2011), receiving rave reviews from The Guardian, Telegraph and Irish Times in addition to Danish Magazine, Jazz Special and Norway's Jazznytt. The critique Ian Patterson of The Guardian comments in his review of Golden Xplosion: "Marius Neset, the 25-year-old Norwegian saxophonist who surfaced in the UK last year with Django Bates (his teacher and mentor at Copenhagen's Rhythmic Music Conservatory), not only combines Brecker's power and Jan Garbarek's tonal delicacy, but has a vision that makes all 11 originals on this sensational album feel indispensable, and indispensably connected to each other. Bonuses include an inspired Bates on piano and synths, and the formidable Phronesis rhythm section of bassist Jasper Høiby and drummer Anton Eger."

In 2012 Neset collaborated with the violinist Adam Bałdych on the album Imaginary Room within "The Baltic Gang", including Jacob Karlzon (piano), Lars Danielsson (double bass), Morten Lund (drums) & Verneri Pohjola (trumpet). The third solo album Birds (2013) was called "a heady concoction that surprises at every turn and enthralls in its stirring ensemble passages and epic scope", by the All About Jazz reviewer Ian Patterson. Here Neset is accompanied by Ivo Neame (piano), Jim Hart (vibraphone), Jasper Høiby (upright bass), Anton Eger (drums), Ingrid Neset (flute & piccolo flute), Daniel Herskedal (tuba), Bjarke Mogensen (accordion), Tobias Wiklund (trumpet), Ronny Farsund (trumpet), Peter Jensen (trombone) and Lasse Mauritzen (French horn). The reviewer of NRK Jazz states: "He abolishes the border between jazz and symphonic music and elevates thus both genres to unprecedented heights. He signed up for the label ACT Records in 2013. His first ACT release "Lion" (2014) together with the "Trondheim Jazz Orchestra" reached international acclaim as one of the most important large ensemble albums of 2014. Marius Neset's new quintet album "Pinball" was released on January 30, 2015 on ACT.

Honors 
 2004: The Nattjazz talent award
 2011: "Sildajazzprisen" at the Jazz festival in Haugesund
 2012: This years "JazZtipendiat" at Moldejazz
 2014: "Spellemannprisen" in the category Jazz, with Trondheim Jazz Orchestra for the album Lion
 2016: DownBeat magazine: “25 for the Future”

Discography

As leader/co-leader 
 2011: Golden Xplosion (Edition)
 2013: Birds (Edition)
 2014: Lion (ACT)
 2015: Pinball (ACT)
 2016: Snowmelt (ACT)
 2017: Circle of Chimes (ACT)
 2019: Viaduct (ACT)
 2020: Tributes with Danish Radio Big Band (ACT Music, 2020)

With Daniel Herskedal
 2012: Neck of the Woods (Edition)

Collaborative works 
Within JazzKamikaze
 2005: Mission I (Stunt)
 2007: Travelling at the speed of sound (Stunt)
 2008: Emergin pilots EP (SevenSeas)
 2009: The revolution's in your hands EP (SevenSeas)
 2010: Supersonic revolutions (SevenSeas)
 2012: The return of JazzKamikaze (Stunt)

Within People Are Machines
 2007: People Are Machines (Calibrated)
 2007: Live Getxo (Errabal)
 2008: Suite for the Seven Mountains (Calibrated)
 2011: Fractal (Cloud)

With Django Bates
 2008: Spring is Here (Shall We Dance?) (Lost Marble), within StoRMChaser Big Band

With Ole Amund Gjersvik
 2011: Duo Improvisations (Acoustic)

With Adam Bałdych & The Baltic Gang
 2012: Imaginary Room (ACT)

With Dave Stapleton
 2013: Flight (Edition)

With Esbjörn Svensson Trio e.s.t.
 2016: E.S.T. Symphony (ACT)

References

External links 

Marius Neset Quartet - Golden Xplosion (live 2013) on YouTube
Marius Neset – Masterclass – Old Poison (XL) on YouTube
Marius Neset at Edition Records
JazzKamikaze
Plateanmeldelse av Suite For The Seven Mountains (in Danish)

20th-century Norwegian saxophonists
21st-century Norwegian saxophonists
Norwegian jazz saxophonists
Norwegian jazz clarinetists
Norwegian jazz composers
Avant-garde jazz musicians
Edition artists
ACT Music artists
Musicians from Os, Hordaland
1985 births
Living people
20th-century saxophonists
21st-century clarinetists
JazzKamikaze members
Edition Records artists